Little Stretton (otherwise Stretton Parva) is a small village and civil parish in the Harborough district of Leicestershire, England. The population is included in the civil parish of Burton Overy.

Within the parish, to the west of Little Stretton village, lies a deserted medieval village called Stretton Magna (or Great Stretton).

Gartree Road, a Roman Road, runs through the parish, adjacent to both Little and Great Stretton, and is the reason for those settlements' names (see: Stretton).

In 1919, the village gained a certain notoriety as the location of the Green Bicycle Case, the killing of Bella Wright.

Parish Church

The church of Little Stretton is the Chapel of Ease, St Clement, Stretton Parva (in the parish of St John the Baptist, King's Norton, Leicestershire)

Rectors, Vicars and Patrons
1220 William de Kibworth
1234 Robert de Diwurne
1238 William Ordiz
1261 Simon de Slybur
1287 Roger de Barneburg
1391 Richard Dollesdon
1534 Thomas Burg
1560 Thomas Tookie
1671 James Rosse
1714 William Wallis
1726 Francis Miles
1733 Thomas Milward
1737 John Vann
1749 William Ludlam
1783 Thomas Rogers
1788 Richard Walker
1826 Thomas Charles Ord
1844 Hugh Palliser de Costobadie
1887 Caleb Eacott
1911 Hubert Woodall Brown
1938 Walter Ricon Davis
1948 John Sydney Lewis David
1951 Frank Allen Cox
1956 Edward Hudspith
1963 Derek Henry Kingham
1973 Albert Edward Kemp
1983 Roger Wakeley
1988 Ashley Frederick Bruce Cheeseman
2010 John Morley
2012 Vacant

See also
Stretton Hall, Leicestershire

References

External links

 Village history
 Census 2001 Parish Profile from Leicestershire County Council
 Detailed history of Little Stretton (originally part of Kings Norton parish)
 Ordnance Survey mapping of Little Stretton
 Photographs of the OS grid square for Little Stretton from Geograph
 Search for designated historic sites and buildings in Little Stretton
 Account of the Green Bicycle murder at Little Stretton 5 July 1919

Villages in Leicestershire
Civil parishes in Harborough District